Dallas Center–Grimes Community School District is a rural public school district headquartered in Grimes, Iowa.

The district is in Polk County and in Dallas County. It serves Dallas Center and All of Grimes (but Johnston border) and sections of Urbandale.

Schools
Secondary:
 Dallas Center–Grimes High School (grades 9–12)
 Dallas Center-Grimes Oak View (grades 7–8)
 Dallas Center–Grimes Middle School (grades 5–6)

Primary:
 Dallas Center Elementary School (grades K-4)
 Heritage Elementary School (grades K-4)
 North Ridge Elementary School (grades K-4)
 South Prairie Elementary School (grades K-4)

Preschool:
 Dallas Center–Grimes Preschool (ages 3–4)

Dallas Center–Grimes High School

Athletics
The Mustangs compete in the Little Hawkeye Conference in the following sports:

Baseball
2012 Class 3A state champions
Basketball (boys and girls)
Bowling (boys and girls)
Cross country (boys and girls)
Football
Golf (boys and girls)
Soccer (boys and girls)
Softball
3-time Class 4A state champions (2013, 2014, 2015}
Swimming (boys and girls)
Tennis (boys and girls)
Track and field (boys and girls)
Volleyball
Wrestling
 1984 Class 1A state champions

Enrollment

See also
List of school districts in Iowa
List of high schools in Iowa

References

External links
Dallas Center-Grimes Community School District

School districts in Iowa
Education in Dallas County, Iowa
Education in Polk County, Iowa